Wiśniówka  is a type of nalewka, a sweet Polish liqueur, or cordial, made by macerating (soaking) sour cherries in vodka or neutral spirits.

It can be purchased ready-made, or made at home using just sour cherries, sugar and alcohol. It is one of the most common and popular types of nalewka, usually made at the end of summer. Typically, the alcoholic content ranges from 30% to 50%.

References 

Polish liqueurs
Cherry liqueurs and spirits